The Cutter Expansive Classification system is a library classification system devised by Charles Ammi Cutter. The system was the basis for the top categories of the Library of Congress Classification.

History of the Expansive Classification 
Charles Ammi Cutter (1837–1903), inspired by the decimal classification of his contemporary Melvil Dewey, and with Dewey's initial encouragement, developed his own classification scheme for the Winchester Town Library and then the Boston Athenaeum, at which he served as librarian for twenty-four years. He began work on it around the year 1880, publishing an overview of the new system in 1882. The same classification would later be used, but with a different notation, also devised by Cutter, at the Cary Library in Lexington, Massachusetts.

Many libraries found this system too detailed and complex for their needs, and Cutter received many requests from librarians at small libraries who wanted the classification adapted for their collections. He devised the Expansive Classification in response, to meet the needs of growing libraries, and to address some of the complaints of his critics. Cutter completed and published an introduction and schedules for the first six classifications of his new system (Expansive Classification: Part I: The First Six Classifications), but his work on the seventh was interrupted by his death in 1903.

The Cutter Expansive Classification, although adopted by comparatively few libraries, has been called one of the most logical and scholarly of American classifications. Library historian Leo E. LaMontagne writes:

Cutter produced the best classification of the nineteenth century. While his system was less "scientific" than that of J. P. Lesley, its other key features – notation, specificity, and versatility – make it deserving of the praise it has received.

Its top level divisions served as a basis for the Library of Congress classification, which also took over some of its features. It did not catch on as did Dewey's system because Cutter died before it was completely finished, making no provision for the kind of development necessary as the bounds of knowledge expanded and scholarly emphases changed throughout the twentieth century.

Structure of the Expansive Classification 
The Expansive Classification uses seven separate schedules, each designed to be used by libraries of different sizes. After the first, each schedule was an expansion of the previous one, and Cutter provided instructions for how a library might change from one expansion to another as it grows.

Summary of the Expansive Classification schedules

First classification 
The first classification is meant for only the very small libraries. The first classification has only seven top level classes, and only eight classes in all.

 A Works of reference and general works which include several of the following sections, and so could not go in any one.
 B Philosophy and Religion
 E Biography
 F History and Geography and Travels
 H Social sciences
 L Natural sciences and Arts
 Y Language and Literature
 YF Fiction

Further classifications 
Further expansions add more top level classes and subdivisions. Many subclasses arranged systematically, with common divisions, such as those by geography and language, following a consistent system throughout.

By the fifth classification all the letters of the alphabet are in use for top level classes. These are:

 A General Works
 B Philosophy
 C Christianity and Judaism
 D Ecclesiastical History
 E Biography
 F History, Universal History
 G Geography and Travels
 H Social Sciences
 I Demotics, Sociology
 J Civics, Government, Political Science
 K Legislation
 L Science and Arts together
 M Natural History
 N Botany
 O Zoology
 P Anthropology and Ethnology
 Q Medicine
 R Useful arts, Technology
 S Constructive arts (Engineering and Building)
 T Manufactures and Handicrafts
 U Art of War
 V Recreative arts, Sports, Games, Festivals
 W Art
 X English Language
 Y English and American literature
 Z Book arts

These schedules were not meant to be fixed, but were to be adapted to meet the needs of each library. For example, books on the English language may be put in X, and books on language in general in a subclass of X, or this can be reversed. The first option is less logical, but results in shorter marks for most English language libraries.

How Expansive Classification call numbers are constructed 

Most call numbers in the Expansive Classification follow conventions offering clues to the book's subject. The first line represents the subject, the second the author (and perhaps title), the third and fourth dates of editions, indications of translations, and critical works on particular books or authors. All numbers in the Expansive Classification are (or should be) shelved as if in decimal order.

Size of volumes is indicated by points (.), pluses (+), or slashes (/ or //).

For some subjects a numerical geographical subdivision follows the classification letters on the first line. The number 83 stands for the United States—hence, F83 is U.S. history, G83 U.S. travel, JU83 U.S. politics, WP83 U.S. painting. Geographical numbers are often further expanded decimally to represent more specific areas, sometimes followed by a capital letter indicating a particular city.

The second line usually represents the author's name by a capital letter plus one or more numbers arranged decimally. This may be followed by the first letter or letters of the title in lower-case, and/or sometimes the letters a, b, c indicating other printings of the same title. When appropriate, the second line may begin with a 'form' number—e.g., 1 stands for history and criticism of a subject, 2 for a bibliography, 5 for a dictionary, 6 for an atlas or maps, 7 for a periodical, 8 for a society or university publication, 9 for a collection of works by different authors.

On the third line a capital Y indicates a work about the author or book represented by the first two lines, and a capital E (for English—other letters are used for other languages) indicates a translation into English. If both criticism and translation apply to a single title, the number expands into four lines.

Cutter numbers (Cutter codes) 

One of the features adopted by other systems, including Library of Congress, is the Cutter number. It is an alphanumeric device to code text so that it can be arranged in alphabetical order using the fewest characters. It contains one or two initial letters and Arabic numbers, treated as a decimal. To construct a Cutter number, a cataloguer consults a Cutter table as required by the classification rules.  Although Cutter numbers are mostly used for coding the names of authors, the system can be used for titles, subjects, geographic areas, and more.

Initial letters Qa–Qt are assigned Q2–Q29, while entries beginning with numerals have a Cutter number A12–A19, therefore sorting before the first A entry.

So to make the three digit Cutter number for "Cutter", you would start with "C", then looking under other consonants, find that "u" gives the number 8, and under additional letters, "t" is 8, giving a Cutter number of "C88".

Notes

References 
 Bliss, Henry Evelyn. The Organization of Knowledge in Libraries: and the Subject-Approach to Books, 2nd ed. New York: H. W. Wilson, 1939.
 Cutter, Charles A. Rules for a Dictionary Catalog. W. P. Cutter, ed. 4th ed. Washington, D.C.: Government Printing Office, 1904. London: The Library Association, 1962.
 Cutter, William Parker. Charles Ammi Cutter. Chicago: American Library Association, 1931. Ann Arbor, MI: University Microfilms, 1969.
 Foster, William E. "Charles Ammi Cutter: A Memorial Sketch". Library Journal 28 (1903): 697–704.
 Hufford, Jon R. "The Pragmatic Basis of Catalog Codes: Has the User Been Ignored?". Cataloging and Classification Quarterly 14 (1991): 27–38.
 Immroth, John Philip. "Cutter, Charles Ammi". Encyclopedia of Library and Information Science. Allen Kent and Harold Lancour, ed. 47 vols. New York, M. Dekker [1968– ]
 LaMontagne, Leo E. American Library Classification: With Special Reference to the Library of Congress. Hamden, CT, Shoe String Press. 1961.
Slavis, Dobrica. "CUTT-x: An Expert System for Automatic Assignment of Cutter Numbers". Cataloging and Classification Quarterly. Vol 22, no. 2, 1996.
 Tauber, Maurice F., and Edith Wise. "Classification Systems". Ralph R. Shaw, ed.. The State of the Library Art. New Brunswick, NJ: Rutgers U. Graduate School of Library Service, 1961. 1–528.

External links 
 The Boston Athenaeum's Guide to the classification system developed by Cutter for their collection
 Forbes Library's Outline of Cutter's Expansive Classification system
 A brief guide to the Expansive Classification from Forbes Library
 Rules for a dictionary catalog, by Charles A. Cutter, fourth edition, hosted by the UNT Libraries Digital Collections
 Library of Congress Guidelines for using the LC Online Shelflist and formulating a literary author number: Cutter Table
 Dewey Cutter Program
 Three figure Cutter-Sanborn number on line

Library cataloging and classification
Knowledge representation